Andriy Viktorovych Polunin (born 5 March 1971) is a Ukrainian retired professional footballer who played as a midfielder.

Career
Since 2007 he worked as a sports director with FC Naftovyk-Ukrnafta Okhtyrka.

He made his professional debut in the Soviet Second League in 1989 for Shakhtar Pavlohrad.

Career statistics
Scores and results list Ukraine's goal tally first, score column indicates score after each Polunin goal.

Honours
 Ukrainian Premier League runner-up: 1993
 Ukrainian Premier League bronze: 1992, 1995, 1996, 1998
 Vyscha Liha Footballer of the Year: 1996

References

External links
 

1971 births
Living people
Footballers from Dnipro
Soviet footballers
Ukrainian footballers
Association football midfielders
Ukraine international footballers
FC Dnipro players
FC Karpaty Lviv players
FC Kryvbas Kryvyi Rih players
1. FC Nürnberg players
FC St. Pauli players
Rot-Weiss Essen players
Soviet Top League players
Ukrainian Premier League players
Bundesliga players
2. Bundesliga players
Ukrainian expatriate footballers
Ukrainian expatriate sportspeople in Germany
Expatriate footballers in Germany